Lepidoblennius haplodactylus, known commonly as the eastern jumping blenny, is a species of triplefin blenny in the genus Lepidoblennius. It was described by Franz Steindachner in 1867 and is the type species of the genus Lepidoblennius.

Description
The eastern jumping blenny has a body which is slightly compressed and a head which has no scales and has a steep upper jaw. It is greyish to greenish yellow on its upperparts, becoming paler towards the belly. There are normally five dark saddle-like markings along its back while the flanks are marked with small irregular pearly spots and dark blotches or vertical streaks. There is a brown band which runs from the eye to the upper jaw. It can be identified from the allopatric western jumping blenny by having a broad membrane separating the third and fourth spine in the dorsal fin.

Distribution
The eastern jumping blenny is endemic to the eastern coast of Australia. It is found from Rockhampton, Queensland to Western Port, Victoria.

Habitat and biology
The eastern jumping blenny is found on shallow reefs where there are exposed rocks covered in algae, it is common in the intertidal zone and it is frequently observed at low tide on the water's edge when it can be seen to hop over damp, rocky surfaces.

Etymology and taxonomy
The genus name Lepidoblennius means "scaled blenny" while the specific name is a compound of  meaning "single" and  meaning "finger", a reference to the unbranched spines and rays of its  pectoral, anal and caudal fins. It was described by the Austrian ichthyologist Franz Steindachner in 1867 and the type locality is the Fitzroy River at Rockhampton Queensland. It is the type species of its genus.

References

Eastern jumping blenny
Fish described in 1867